Joana Jiménez García (born 19 August 1993) is a Mexican synchronized swimmer.

Along with Nuria Diosdado, Jiménez won the silver medal at the 2019 Pan-American Games in the duet. She represented Mexico at the 2020 Summer Olympics with Diosdado.

References 

1990 births
Living people
Mexican synchronized swimmers
Olympic synchronized swimmers of Mexico
Synchronized swimmers at the 2020 Summer Olympics
People from Ecatepec de Morelos
Synchronized swimmers at the 2015 Pan American Games
Artistic swimmers at the 2019 Pan American Games
Pan American Games medalists in synchronized swimming
Pan American Games silver medalists for Mexico
Synchronized swimmers at the 2017 World Aquatics Championships
Central American and Caribbean Games gold medalists for Mexico
Competitors at the 2014 Central American and Caribbean Games
Competitors at the 2018 Central American and Caribbean Games
Artistic swimmers at the 2019 World Aquatics Championships
Artistic swimmers at the 2022 World Aquatics Championships
Central American and Caribbean Games medalists in synchronized swimming
Medalists at the 2015 Pan American Games
Medalists at the 2019 Pan American Games
Sportspeople from the State of Mexico